Empire Star may refer to:
Empire Star, a 1966 novella by Samuel R. Delany
BSA Empire Star, a model of motorcycle built from 1936 to 1939
, a Blue Star Line ship built as Empirestar and carrying this name from 1929–35
, a Blue Star Line ship built in 1935 and sunk in 1942
, a Blue Star Line ship in service 1946–50